Selenopeltis is an extinct genus of odontopleurid trilobites in the family Odontopleuridae.

These trilobites show long pleural spines and were a low-level epifaunal detritivore. They lived in the Ordovician period, from the Lower Arenig stage age until the Ashgillian age (478.6-443.7 million years ago).

Distribution
During the Ordovician they inhabited Czech Republic, France, Morocco, Portugal, Spain and the United Kingdom. During the Arenig they lived in France and the UK.

Gallery

Sources 
S. buchii at Fossilmuseum
Selenopeltis sp. at Origins.swau.edu

External links
Selenopeltis in the Paleobiology Database
Sepkoski, Jack Sepkoski's Online Genus Database – Trilobita

Odontopleuridae
Odontopleurida genera
Ordovician trilobites of Europe
Fossils of the Czech Republic
Letná Formation
Trilobites of Africa
Fezouata Formation fossils